The 2013–14 NBL season was the 36th season of competition since its establishment in 1979. A total of eight teams contested the league. The regular season was played between 10 October 2013 and 23 March 2014, and was followed by a post-season featuring the top four in late March and April 2014. The schedule was announced on 9 August 2013. The Perth Wildcats defeated the Adelaide 36ers 2–1 in the three-game finals series, with the final match at Perth Arena attended by 13,498 people.

Australian broadcast rights to the season were held by free-to-air network Channel Ten and its digital sports sister station One, in the fourth year of a five-year deal, through to the 2014–15 season. In New Zealand, Sky Sport are the official league broadcaster, in the second year of a three-year deal.

Pre-season

Sydney Kings pre-season

Cairns Taipans pre-season

Wollongong Hawks pre-season

Melbourne Tigers pre-season

Adelaide 36ers pre-season

2013 Intercontinental Cup Basketball Challenge 

Adelaide 36ers finish fourth (last).

Perth Wildcats pre-season

New Zealand Breakers pre-season

Townsville Crocodiles pre-season

2013 NBL Pre-Season Blitz 
A pre-season tournament featuring all eight teams was held on 20–22 September 2013 at Northern Suburbs Indoor Sports Centre, Sydney. The winner received the inaugural Loggins-Bruton Cup.

Opening round

Final round 

Perth Wildcats are pre-season champions.

Regular season

Round 1

Round 2

Round 3

Round 4

Round 5

Round 6

Round 7

Round 8

Round 9

Round 10

Round 11

Round 12

Round 13

Round 14

Round 15

Round 16

Round 17

Round 18

Round 19

Round 20

Round 21

Round 22

Round 23

Ladder

1Sydney Kings won Head-to-Head (3-1).

Finals 

The 2013–14 National Basketball League Finals will be played in March and April 2014, consisting of two best-of-three semi-final and final series, where the higher seed hosts the first and third games.

Playoff Seedings 

 Perth Wildcats
 Adelaide 36ers
 Melbourne Tigers
 Wollongong Hawks

The NBL tie-breaker system as outlined in the NBL Rules and Regulations states that in the case of an identical win–loss record, the results in games played between the teams will determine order of seeding.

Playoff bracket

Semi-finals

Grand final

Season statistics

Statistics leaders

Note: regular season only (minimum 14 games) and excluding negligible attempts

Attendances

Regular season

Finals

Top 10 Attendances

Awards

Player of the Month

Coach of the Month

Pre-season
 Most Valuable Player (Ray Borner Medal): James Ennis, Perth Wildcats

Season
The end-of-season awards ceremony was held in the Sketch private dining room at Docklands, Melbourne on Wednesday, 2 April 2014.

 Most Valuable Player (Andrew Gaze Trophy): Rotnei Clarke, Wollongong Hawks
 Rookie of the Year: Tom Jervis, Perth Wildcats
 Best Defensive Player: Damian Martin, Perth Wildcats
 Best Sixth Man: Kevin Tiggs, Wollongong Hawks
 Most Improved Player: Nate Tomlinson, Melbourne Tigers
 Coach of the Year (Lindsay Gaze Trophy): Gordie McLeod, Wollongong Hawks
 Referee of the Year: Michael Aylen
 All-NBL First Team:
 Rotnei Clarke - Wollongong Hawks
 Chris Goulding - Melbourne Tigers
 James Ennis - Perth Wildcats
 Daniel Johnson - Adelaide 36ers
 Andrew Ogilvy - Sydney Kings
 All-NBL Second Team:
 Damian Martin - Perth Wildcats
 Jermaine Beal - Perth Wildcats
 Sam Young - Sydney Kings
 Mika Vukona - New Zealand Breakers
 Brian Conklin - Townsville Crocodiles

Finals
 Grand Final Series MVP (Larry Sengstock Medal): Jermaine Beal, Perth Wildcats

See also
 2013–14 Adelaide 36ers season
 2013–14 New Zealand Breakers season

References

 
Australia,NBL
2013–14 in Australian basketball
2013 in New Zealand basketball
2014 in New Zealand basketball